The Annales iuvavenses or Annals of Salzburg were a series of annals written in the 9th and 10th centuries at Salzburg (the former Roman Iuvavum) in the East Frankish stem duchy of Bavaria. They are a useful source for southeastern Germany and Austria where they exist, but they only survive in fragments copied at the scriptorium of Admont Abbey in the 12th century.

According to the Annales Iuvavenses, in 920 Baiuarii sponte se reddiderunt Arnolfo duci et regnare eum fecerunt in regno Teutonicorum: "the Bavarians, with some other East Franks, elected Arnulf German king in opposition to Henry" (actually in 919). This provides some of the only evidence for the concept of a "Kingdom of Germany" before the late 11th century, but it may be a 12th-century interpolation, as most scholars perceive it to be. The Salzburg annals are also the only source for an assassination attempt on incapacitated King Carloman by the Bavarians in 878, the first medieval mention of Vienna in 881, and the location of the Battle of Pressburg (Brezalauspurc) against the Hungarians in 907.

References

10th-century history books
History books about Austria
Duchy of Bavaria
Medieval Latin historical texts
Salzburg
10th-century Latin books